The 1805 Massachusetts gubernatorial election was held on April 2.

Federalist Governor Caleb Strong was re-elected to a sixth consecutive one-year term in office, defeating Republican James Sullivan for the second time, only narrowly achieving the majority necessary for election.

General election

Results

References

Governor
1805
Massachusetts
April 1805 events